Anastasiya Olegovna Danchenko (born 21 January 1990; as Anastasiya Olegovna Panushkina) is a Russian badminton player.

Achievements

BWF International Challenge/Series 
Mixed doubles

  BWF International Challenge tournament
  BWF International Series tournament
  BWF Future Series tournament

References

External links 
 

1990 births
Living people
Badminton players from Moscow
Russian female badminton players
21st-century Russian women